David James Pelzer (born December 29, 1960, in San Francisco, California) is an American author of several autobiographical and self-help books. His 1995 memoir of childhood abuse, A Child Called "It": One Child's Courage to Survive, was listed on The New York Times Bestseller List for several years, and in 5 years had sold at least 1.6 million copies. This book brought Pelzer fame, and also been a source of controversy, with accusations of several events being fabricated coming from both family members and journalists.

Biography
Pelzer was born in San Francisco, California on December 29, 1960, and was the second of five boys. He grew up in Daly City, California. He is the son of Catherine Roerva Christen Pelzer (1929-1992) and San Francisco fireman Stephen Joseph Pelzer (1923-1980). Pelzer's books describe the abuse he suffered for several years of his childhood, including continual mistreatment and beatings by his mother, who he said thought of it as a game. His teachers stepped in on March 5, 1973, when 12-year-old Pelzer was placed in foster care. At age 18 he joined the U.S. Air Force in 1979 and served in the Gulf War. In the 1980s Pelzer married his first wife Patsy (a pseudonym), with whom he had a son. In 1996 he carried a torch in the 1996 Summer Olympics torch relay. Pelzer and Patsy divorced and many years later he married his second wife, Marsha, who was his editor.

Childhood experiences
Pelzer's book A Child Called "It" describes from his viewpoint the severe abuse he suffered as a child. He writes how his mother was physically and emotionally abusive towards him from ages 4 to 12. He describes how his mom starved him, forced him to drink ammonia, stabbed him in the stomach, burned his arm on a gas stove, and forced him to eat his own vomit. He mentioned that his father was not active in resolving or stopping the conflicts between Pelzer and his alcoholic mother. He was sent to a foster family at age 12 in 1973. His second book The Lost Boy covers the time frame when he was in foster care. In his books, he refers to his relatives by pseudonyms. By the time Pelzer was taken out of the home, he had already suffered a great deal mentally. This caused Pelzer to act out growing up. Although the main abuse had stopped, he faced continued mental anguish. Throughout his teen years, he struggled to feel loved. Being in a foster home and having suffered abuse caused him to yearn for the family and love he couldn't have. He later forgave his father for ignoring the abuse, and wrote a letter to his mom saying he loved her as his mother, but would never see her again. She died before he could send it. Throughout the rest of his life, he somewhat healed from the abuse but will never forget what he had been through. He now has written self help books to help others overcome their challenges and abuse they have suffered. 

One of Pelzer's brothers, Richard B. Pelzer, published his own autobiography, A Brother's Journey, that detailed his experiences. Paraphrased, R. Pelzer said in the afterword of his book that his objectives for his story was to show how a parent can become abusive and how the human spirit can triumph and survive.

Books 
Pelzer's first book, A Child Called "It", was published in 1995 and describes the abuse Pelzer suffered in his childhood. His second book, The Lost Boy: A Foster Child's Search for the Love of a Family was published shortly after in 1997. The book covered Pelzer's teen years. The third book in his series, A Man Named Dave: A Story of Triumph and Forgiveness was about Pelzer's experiences as an adult and how he forgave his father. In 2001 he wrote Help Yourself: Finding Hope, Courage, And Happiness which was a self-help book. When discussing his seventh book Moving Forward he said, "My message has always been about resilience".

 A Child Called "It" - Pelzer's first book, it tells his story and describes the abuse he suffered from ages 0-12. Pelzer was physically and mentally abused by his mother. This book goes into detail of all different kind of abuse he suffered, including beatings, starvation, manipulation games, and even being stabbed. Eventually the book ends with Pelzer escaping his nightmare and being placed into foster care.

 The Lost Boy - Pelzer's second book and a continuation of his first book, A Child Called "It".  This book was released in 1997 and covers the time period in Pelzer's life when he was in foster care. During this book Pelzer faces great emotional turmoil. He had gone to court and described what his mother had done, ending up with him in the foster care system. Pelzer wondered if the abuse he endured was his fault. While in his first foster home Pelzer acted out frequently and had a stealing problem. He would still see his mother, who would visit and promise to get him back, but he eventually ended up going through foster families, getting in more trouble and finally getting sent to a juvenile hall. After Pelzer got out of foster care, he enlisted in the air force. The book ends with Pelzer having learned how to treat others and be a better person.

 A Man Named David - This book is the third in the A Child Called "It" series. This book takes place when Pelzer is an adult. It describes him becoming the person he is now, and how he handles what had happened in the past. He tries to find answers and ways to heal in this book, as well as trying to find closure with his biological mom and dad.

Reception of A Child Called "It"
His first book, A Child Called "It," was successful and generated interest. It was listed on The New York Times Bestseller List for several years and in five years had sold at least 1.6 million copies. Pelzer was invited to television shows such as The Montel Williams Show and The Oprah Winfrey Show to give interviews after the book was published.

In a 2001 news article Orion UK Publishing's Trevor Dolby said, "We get 10 letters a day from people saying the first book mirrors their own childhood, which is very depressing." One reader was quoted: "(The book) made me see that I wasn't the only one out there...that had this...in their life. That there's people who do understand."

Writer David Plotz criticized Pelzer in an article he wrote for Slate. In the article Plotz says that because Pelzer's parents are dead they cannot question how they are depicted.

Awards 
A Child Called "It" has received the following accolades:

 2010 Popular Paperbacks for Young Adults
 2002 Popular Paperbacks for Young Adults

Challenges 
According to the American Library Association, A Child Called "It" has been frequently banned and challenged in the United States. The book landed the 36th spot on the list of the top books challenged between 2010 and 2019.

Controversy
In a 2002 The New York Times article by Pat Jordan, the author questioned the reliability of Pelzer's recollections. He said that "Pelzer has an exquisite recall of his abuse, but almost no recall of anything that would authenticate that abuse", such as any details about his mother. Two members of his family, his maternal grandmother and brother, have disputed his book. One of his younger brothers, Stephen, denied that any abuse took place, and said that he thinks Pelzer was placed in foster care because "he started a fire and was caught shoplifting". However, his other brother, Richard Pelzer, is author of the book A Brother's Journey, which affirms much of what Dave has said and describes his own abuse when Dave was finally removed from the home. In regard to this, Dave Pelzer has said that Stephen is "semi-retarded, he has Bell's palsy. He worshipped my mum. He misses her terribly because she protected him." Due to the criticism from The New York Times article Pelzer does not give interviews often.

In an article in The Boston Globe, Pelzer's grandmother said she believed Pelzer had been abused but not as severely as he described. She also said she didn't believe his brother Richard was abused. It was revealed, however, that Pelzer's grandmother did not live in the same state as his brothers and family and was not in contact with them when the abuse happened.

An article in The Guardian notes that gaps in the background narrative "makes the foreground harder to trust". The author writes, "My own hunch is that, substantially, he's telling the truth ... But there is a definite feeling of exaggeration in the later two books..." The author then states the same feeling Plotz also covered in his article, that she feels Pelzer is profiting from his abuse and minimizing the seriousness of the crime by making the writing "entertaining".

Current life

After writing his many books, David Pelzer spends much of his time doing community work. He has given lectures across the country, and he is also a volunteer. Pelzer is now a motivational speaker and speaks to high school students and adults about the concept of resilience. Pelzer has also sometimes made television appearances about his books.

Work
A Child Called "It" (1995) 
The Lost Boy: A Foster Child's Search for the Love of a Family (1997)
A Man Named Dave: A Story of Triumph and Forgiveness (2000)
Help Yourself (2000)
The Privilege of Youth (2004) 
Help Yourself for Teens (2005)
Moving Forward (2009)

See also
Richard B. Pelzer

References

External links
 Dave Pelzer top selling list
 Dave Pelzer's Official Website
 An interview with Dave Pelzer
 Audio interview with Dave Pelzer at Oprah.com

American memoirists
American self-help writers
United States Air Force airmen
1960 births
Living people
Writers from the San Francisco Bay Area
People from Daly City, California
Nautilus Book Award winners